Berdsk is a town in Novosibirsk Oblast, Russia. A suburb of Novosibirsk, it is on the Berd River. In the 2010 Russian census, its population was

Geography
Berdsk is on the Berd River.

History

The migration of Russians into present-day Novosibirsk Oblast began at the end of the 17th century and continued into the 18th century. The Siberian colonists included fugitive peasants escaping Peter the Great's oppression, Old Believers, and hunters in search of furs in the Siberian woods.

By 1715, the Berd River basin had a significant population. The risk of nomad incursions from the south drove the people to demand that the Tomsk regional authorities build a defensive fortress. The fortress, at the confluence of the Berd and Ob rivers, was protected by steep banks on two sides and dense forest on the third side. The Ob river valley could be seen from the banks. The Siberian Route was laid out nearby in 1730, encouraging the development of trade. At the beginning of the 19th century, a small amount of gold washed up from the upper Berd and the Salair Ridge.

By the beginning of the 20th century, Berdsk became a grain-processing center. The local Gorokhov mill produced several types of flour which were distributed throughout Siberia, Russia and Europe via the Kara Sea. The nearby Altai Railway was built in 1915, connecting Novo-Nikolaevsk, Barnaul and Biysk.

Mobilization during World War I and the Russian Civil War which followed the October Revolution reduced Berdsk's population  by one-third. The town was an administrative center of the White movement and an underground Bolshevik center. The Soviet collectivization of agriculture ended Siberia's role as an agricultural exporter.

Construction of the Novosibirsk Hydroelectric Station placed the main part of Berdsk in the Novosibirsk Reservoir's flood zone. The town was evacuated several years before the reservoir was filled in 1957–1958, and the area around the railroad station was rebuilt. Bersk's oldest buildings date to 1915, and its streets form a grid. The town was home to a Soviet bioweapons production facility.

Administrative and municipal status
As an administrative division, Berdsk is incorporated as the Town of Berdsk. As a municipal division, the town of Berdsk is incorporated as the Berdsk Urban Okrug.

Structure and population
The town is divided into seven microdistricts. About half the population lives in small private, one-story houses with cold water, electricity and cable radio; the other half lives in recently-built municipal housing, some of which has cable TV networks and computer LANs.

Population:

1914: 6,000  
1925: 4,544  
1930: 5,751  
1939: 11,000  
1959: 29,000  
1967: 45,000  
1970: 53,200  
1973: 58,000  
1976: 63,000  
1979: 67,300
1982: 68,000  
1986: 76,000
1989: 79,200
1992: 81,200
1996: 85,600
1998: 85,800
2000: 86,600
2001: 87,300
2003: 88,400
2005: 90,700
2022:103,544

Transportation
The R256 highway passes through Berdsk, connecting Novosibirsk with Altai Krai, the Altai Republic and Mongolia. Berdsk has a network of municipal and private bus routes, including intercity routes to Novosibirsk and Iskitim. The town's central railway station has a number of local elektrichkas and long-distance trains to Altai Krai and Kazakhstan. Private river passenger or cargo traffic is negligible, although Berdsk has a pier for sand barges.

Economy
The Berdsk Vega Production Association, founded in 1959, manufactures domestic civilian and military radios, tape recorders and CD players. It and the Berdsk Electromechanical Plant are listed on the Federation of American Scientists' Russian Defense Business Directory.

Education and culture

Berdsk has about fifteen high schools (the last rebuilt during the 1990s), four trade schools, a secondary school, a lyceum, a management college, a medical secondary school, and several libraries. The town has two palaces of culture. There are three stadiums, five sports schools, a musical school, a museum of history and culture, a park, and a yacht club.

Students enroll in public school at age seven, and graduate eleven years later. Classes are about 40 minutes long. The school day begins at about 8:00 and ends between 12:00 and 14:00, depending on the age of the student. Many students augment their public-school education by attending private, specialized schools after the public-school day ends. Such schools may offer additional training in language, art, or technology.

Ecology
Berd Spit, a city park, has been a protected area since 2006.

Notable residents 

Irina Kazakevich (born 1997), biathlete
Artem Ovechkin (born 1986), racing cyclist

References

Notes

Sources

Moy Gorod Encyclopedia 
Historical review at Berdsk.ru
Berd Ostrog at the Novosibirsk Oblast portal

External links
Official website of Berdsk 
Berdsk Business Directory 
Berdsk in the electronic map "Dubl-GIS Novosibirsk"
Pictures of Berdsk

 
Populated places established in 1716
Populated places on the Berd River
Tomsk Governorate